Freshslice Pizza is a Canadian pizza chain and franchise founded by Ray Russell in 1999. The franchise owns 77 branches across Canada. They are known for their pizza by the slice.

Awards and recognition 
In 2014 and 2015, Freshslice received a Golden Plate award for Best Pizza By The Slice from the Vancouver-based weekly publication The Georgia Straight.

In 2016, Ray Russell and Freshslice were awarded runner-up for the Entrepreneur of the Year Award through BCBusiness and Ernst & Young (EY) for his involvement at Freshslice.

Controversy 

In 2011, two Freshslice Pizza companies and the owner of two franchise outlets were fined $44,000 (Canadian dollars) for employing illegal workers. Companies owned by Ray Russell and corporate employee Bahman Afshari were all charged by the Canada Border Services Agency after a tip led to the discovery that over a dozen illegal immigrants were employed at Freshslice locations in Vancouver. Afshari was also personally charged.

In 2014 Russell was found guilty by the B.C Supreme Court of wrongful dismissal of a corporate employee. The courts ordered a judgement of over $40,000 (Canadian dollars) to the former employee.

In 2022, BC courts ruled in favor of a franchisee group who held ownership in over 10% of the Freshslice locations. This group had claimed recission against Freshslice and rebranded their locations. The courts dismissed an injunction by Freshslice and the locations were able to rebrand. This drastically dropped the location count for Freshslice.

References

Companies based in Burnaby
Restaurants established in 1999
Pizza chains of Canada
1999 establishments in British Columbia
Food and drink companies based in British Columbia